Sukkulovo (Hıwıqqul) is a rural locality (a selo) and the administrative centre of Sukkulovsky Selsoviet, Yermekeyevsky District, Bashkortostan, Russia. The population was 777 as of 2010. There are 11 streets.

Geography 
Sukkulovo is located 22 km north of Yermekeyevo (the district's administrative centre) by road. Mikhaylovka is the nearest rural locality.

References 

Rural localities in Yermekeyevsky District